Nicholas Marangello (died December 30, 1999), also known as "Nicky Glasses", "Nicky Cigars", "Nicky the Butler" and "Little Nicky", was the underboss of the Bonanno crime family under Carmine Galante and saw himself demoted after Galantes death. He's the father-in-law of Robert Perrino and grandfather of Nicola Langora.

Biography
Marangello was born on the Lower East Side, Manhattan in Knickerbocker Village and lived there until his incarceration in the 1990s. He was a small man with slicked back hair, thick glasses and a sharp nose. Because of his thick prescription glasses, it gave people the impression that he was always staring. Marangello was identified as a made member of the Bonanno family by the FBI since the 1960s and started as a personal driver for boss Joe Bonanno.

He operated a prosperous large scale bookmaking and gambling operation in Brooklyn and later expanded to Manhattan. After Carmine Galante became boss of the Bonanno family, Marangello was promoted as underboss. He associated himself with the Sicilian faction of the Bonanno family and operated out of the Toyland Social Club located at 94 Hester Street in Chinatown, New York. He used Toyland as his personal office. He never had anyone visit the social club unless it was concerning business.

He occupied the Toy Association hobbyist club from 12:30 to about 4:00 or 5:00 in the afternoon from Monday to Friday. Mobsters would come, take care of their business and then leave. He was underboss from 1974 to 1979 until Galante was murdered. Undercover FBI agent Joseph "Donnie Brasco" Pistone got to meet Marangello regularly to report the figures of Benjamin "Lefty" Ruggiero's weekly bookmaking operations.

In the 1990s Marangello and longtime friend and Bonanno caporegime Michael Sabella were given a sentence of four to eight years stemming from Racketeer Influenced and Corrupt Organizations Act charges. After Marangello retired, he was replaced by Stefano Cannone. Marangello's most notorious loan shark customer was Bonanno street soldier Benjamin "Lefty" Ruggiero. Ruggiero was a degenerate gambler and by 1977 was indebted to Marangello for $160,000 from the horse races at the Aqueduct Racetrack. Ruggiero's gambling addiction was such that it delayed his induction into the Mafia as "made man."

Until he could pay his debt, Ruggiero could not be "made" and was therefore "put on the shelf." By the summer of 1977, Ruggiero successfully paid back a majority of his debt to Marangello and was finally initiated into the Bonanno family. By the following year in 1978 he had fallen back into debt again from his addiction. As a result, Marangello arranged to have a portion of his criminal operations to be directly applied to Ruggiero's enormous debt.

References
Crittle, Simon, The Last Godfather: The Rise and Fall of Joey Massino Berkley (March 7, 2006) 
Pistone, Joseph D.; & Woodley, Richard (1999) Donnie Brasco: My Undercover Life in the Mafia, Hodder & Stoughton. 

 

Year of birth missing
1999 deaths
Bonanno crime family
American gangsters of Italian descent